José Manuel Taure Menéndez (born April 14, 1949) is a former Spanish handball player. He competed in the 1972 Summer Olympics.

In 1972, he was part of the Spanish team which finished fifteenth in the Olympic tournament. He played all five matches and scored fifteen goals.

References

1949 births
Living people
Spanish male handball players
Olympic handball players of Spain
Handball players at the 1972 Summer Olympics